Siegfried Reischies (10 July 1909 – 12 December 1982) was a German basketball player. He competed in the men's tournament at the 1936 Summer Olympics.

References

1909 births
1982 deaths
German men's basketball players
Olympic basketball players of Germany
Basketball players at the 1936 Summer Olympics
Sportspeople from Königsberg